No Bull is a live video released by AC/DC in November 1996, filmed on Super 16mm at Madrid's Plaza de Toros de Las Ventas on 10 July 1996 during the Ballbreaker world tour. It was directed by David Mallet, produced by Rocky Oldham, mixed by Mike Fraser, and edited by David Gardener and Simon Hilton; production company was Serpent Films.

The show, involving a crane, a large model of "Rosie" and a finale with half a dozen blazing cannons, features 20 live tracks spanning their then 23-year career. It features 4 tracks from Ballbreaker album, as well as other classic songs by the band.

Track listing 
"Back in Black"
"Shot Down in Flames"
"Thunderstruck"
"Girls Got Rhythm"
"Hard as a Rock"
"Shoot to Thrill"
"Boogie Man"
"Hail Caesar"
"Hells Bells"
"Dog Eat Dog"
"The Jack"
"Ballbreaker"
"Rock and Roll Ain't Noise Pollution"
"Dirty Deeds Done Dirt Cheap"
"You Shook Me All Night Long"
"Whole Lotta Rosie"
"T.N.T."
"Let There Be Rock"
"Highway to Hell"
"For Those About to Rock (We Salute You)"

All songs written by Young, Johnson, and Young, except: "Thunderstruck", "Hard as a Rock", "Boogie Man", "Hail Caesar" and "Ballbreaker" by Young, Young; "Shot Down in Flames", "Girls Got Rhythm", "Dog Eat Dog", "The Jack", "Dirty Deeds Done Dirt Cheap", "Whole Lotta Rosie", "T.N.T.", "Let There Be Rock" and "Highway to Hell" by Young, Scott, and Young.

Personnel 

Brian Johnson - lead vocals
Angus Young - lead guitar, backing vocals on "Dirty Deeds Done Dirt Cheap" and "T.N.T."
Malcolm Young - rhythm guitar, backing vocals
Cliff Williams - bass guitar, backing vocals
Phil Rudd - drums

Special features 
Dolby Digital 5.0 Surround Sound
Dolby Digital Stereo
"Hard as a Rock" Promo
"The Making of Hard as a Rock" documentary with interviews with Angus Young and Brian Johnson
Lyrics, Subtitles and Close Captioning

Director's Cut 
Stereo and 5.1 Surround Sound newly mixed and mastered for DVD
Brand new hi-def transfer and re-edit for DVD
Angus' cam versions in:
 "Shoot to Thrill"
 "Hail Caesar"
 "Rock and Roll Ain't Noise Pollution"
 "You Shook Me All Night Long"
Bonus Tracks - Rare Performances from the Ballbreaker World Tour:
 "Cover You in Oil" - from Gothenburg, Sweden
 "Down Payment Blues" - from Daytona Beach, Florida
Full catalog discography.

Certifications

Notes 
Audio versions of "Back in Black," "Hard as a Rock," "Ballbreaker," "Whole Lotta Rosie," and "Let There Be Rock" are available on the Australian Stiff Upper Lip Tour Edition, and also as b-sides of each "Stiff Upper Lip" single.
 Audio versions of "Hard as a Rock," "Dog Eat Dog", "Ballbreaker," "Whole Lotta Rosie," and "You Shook Me All Night Long" are available on Deluxe Edition of Backtracks.
The first releases of No Bull in the U.K. included a limited edition CD single with live versions of "Hard as a Rock," "Hail Caesar," and "Dog Eat Dog."

References 

AC/DC video albums
AC/DC live albums
1996 video albums
Live video albums
1996 live albums
Films directed by David Mallet (director)